Montana is an unincorporated community located in the town of Montana, in Buffalo County, Wisconsin, United States.

History
A post office called Montana was established in 1873, and remained in operation until 1907. The community was named after the Montana Territory.

References

Unincorporated communities in Buffalo County, Wisconsin
Unincorporated communities in Wisconsin